Mount Jalovec is a mountain in the Julian Alps. With an elevation of 2,645 m, it is the sixth-highest peak in Slovenia. It stands between the Tamar, Koritnica, and Trenta Alpine valleys. Nearby peaks include Mangart to the west, Travnik and Mojstrovka to the east, and Ponce to the north. The Log Cliff stands immediately southwest of Mount Jalovec.

Name
Mount Jalovec was attested in written sources as early as 1763–87 as Jellauz and Jelauz. The name is derived from the Slovene adjective jalov 'barren, infertile', referring to the lack of vegetation on the slopes of the mountain.

See also
 List of mountains in Slovenia
 Julian Alps

References

External links 

Mountains of the Julian Alps
Triglav National Park
Two-thousanders of Slovenia